Yuan Yi (died 192), courtesy name Boye, was an official and minor warlord who lived during the late Eastern Han dynasty of China.

Life
Yuan Yi was from Ruyang County, Runan Commandery, which is in present-day Shangshui County, Henan. He was a second cousin of Yuan Shao, Yuan Shu and Yuan Yin. In the early part of his official career, he held positions such as Prefect of Chang'an and Administrator of Shanyang (山陽郡; around present-day Jinxiang County, Shandong).

Yuan Yi received high praise from his contemporaries such as the scholar Zhang Chao from Hejian Commandery and the warlord Cao Cao. Zhang Chao, in recommending Yuan Yi as a talent to Zhu Jun, said that Yuan Yi was very well read and knowledgeable, while Cao Cao said that Yuan Yi maintained his diligence towards studying even after he had grown up.

In 190, Yuan Yi, then the Administrator of Shanyang Commandery, led the troops from his commandery to join a coalition of warlords in a military campaign against the tyrannical warlord Dong Zhuo, who had been controlling the Han central government and the figurehead Emperor Xian since 189. The coalition was led by Yuan Yi's cousin Yuan Shao; another of Yuan Yi's cousins, Yuan Shu, was also a member of the coalition. The coalition broke up by 191 as its members pursued different interests, such as territorial gains.

In 192, following the death of Chen Wen, the Inspector of Yang Province, Yuan Shao nominated Yuan Yi as the new Inspector to replace Chen Wen. At the time, Yuan Shao was in a proxy war with his half-brother Yuan Shu, who had occupied much of Yang Province. Yuan Yi was killed in Pei County while en route to Yang Province to assume office.

See also
 Lists of people of the Three Kingdoms

References

 Chen, Shou (3rd century). Records of the Three Kingdoms (Sanguozhi).
 Pei, Songzhi (5th century). Annotations to Records of the Three Kingdoms (Sanguozhi zhu).

2nd-century births
192 deaths
Political office-holders in Shandong
Political office-holders in Anhui
Han dynasty people killed in battle